Gymnetis is a genus of beetles of the family Scarabaeidae and subfamily Cetoniinae.

Species
 Gymnetis amazona Ratcliffe, 2018
 Gymnetis aurantivittae Ratcliffe, 2018
 Gymnetis bajula (Olivier, 1789)
 Gymnetis bomplandi Schaum, 1844 
 Gymnetis bouvieri Bourgoin, 1912 
 Gymnetis carbo (Schürhoff, 1937) 
 Gymnetis cerdai Antoine, 2001 
 Gymnetis chalcipes Gory & Percheron, 1833 
 Gymnetis chevrolati Gory & Percheron, 1833 
 Gymnetis coturnix Burmeister, 1842 
 Gymnetis difficilis Burmeister, 1842  
 Gymnetis drogoni Ratcliffe, 2018
 Gymnetis flava (Weber, 1801) 
 Gymnetis flaveola (Fabricius, 1801) 
 Gymnetis flavomarginata Blanchard, 1846 
 Gymnetis hebraica (Drapiez, 1820) 
 Gymnetis hieroglyphica Vigors, 1825 
 Gymnetis holosericea (Olivier, 1789) 
 Gymnetis lanius (Linnaeus, 1758) 
 Gymnetis margineguttata Gory & Percheron, 1833 
 Gymnetis marmorea (Olivier, 1789)  
 Gymnetis merops Ratcliffe, 2018
 Gymnetis pantherina Burmeister, 1842 
 Gymnetis pardalis Gory & Percheron, 1833 
 Gymnetis poecila Schaum, 1848 
 Gymnetis pudibunda Burmeister, 1866  
 Gymnetis puertoricensis Ratcliffe, 2018
 Gymnetis pulchra (Swederus, 1787)
 Gymnetis punctipennis Burmeister, 1842  
 Gymnetis rhaegali Ratcliffe, 2018
 Gymnetis rufilatris (Illiger, 1800)
 Gymnetis sallei Schaum, 1849 
 Gymnetis sculptiventris Thomson, 1878 
 Gymnetis stellata (Latreille, 1813) 
 Gymnetis strigosa (Olivier, 1789) 
 Gymnetis thula Ratcliffe, 2018 (= G. caseyi Antoine, 2001)
 Gymnetis subpunctata Westwood, 1874  
 Gymnetis viserioni Ratcliffe, 2018
 Gymnetis xanthospila Schaum, 1844

References
   Biolib
  Gymnetis - Generic Guide to New World Scarab Beetles

Cetoniinae